Israel Goldberg (1887 – August 1964), better known by the pen-name Rufus Learsi, was an American-Jewish educator, author and journalist.

Life
Learsi was born near Białystok in Poland, and emigrated to the US with his parents as a child.  His education was in the New York public school system and his degree from City College in 1909.  He taught history and foreign languages in high schools, later turning to writing.

He wrote extensively on Jewish history, and was founder and editor of World Over, also editing the Zionist Quarterly and the Jewish Forum.

He was active with the Jewish Education Association and the Jewish Education Committee.

He wrote, in his role as chairman of the Seder Ritual Committee, the Seder Ritual of Remembrance "for the six million Jews who perished at the hands of the Nazis and the heroes of the Warsaw uprising", which was widely published as part of the Seder in the US in the late 1950s and the early 1960s, though it was never part of any haggadah.

Works
 Plays for Great Occasions (1914)
 Israel; A History of the Jewish People
 The Jews in America: A History (1954)
 Outline of Jewish Knowledge (three volumes) (with Samson Benderley)
 The Wedding Song, a Book of Chasidic Ballads (1938)
 Shimmele (1940)
 Shimmele and His Friends (1940)
 Fulfilment, the Epic Story of Zionism (1951)

References

1887 births
1964 deaths
People from Białystok
Congress Poland emigrants to the United States